Sabreen Hisbani is a Pakistani actress. She worked in an airline company in Pakistan as a flight attendant. She also has worked in several acclaimed drama serials including Kitni Girhain Baaki Hain, Nikhar Gaye Gulab Sare, Saat Pardon Mein, Sanjha, Aun Zara and LAA. With the former two earning her a wide spread acclaim and recognition. She was nominated as a Best Supporting Actress at 3rd Hum Awards for Laa while she won the award at 4th Pakistan Media Awards for Aunn Zara in the same category.

Early life and career
Sabreen was born on September 10, 1978 in Karachi to Altaf Sheikh. She is the sister of famous host Sanam Baloch, and Sabreen's mother was a Lok Sindhi singer. She has two sisters and two brothers. Her sister Sanam Baloch is an acclaimed actress. She was a flight attendant for PIA then began her career in 2005 in the PTV drama serial Masuri, which gives her wide acclaim, she successfully established herself as an actress in industry. Since she has appeared in drama serials, sitcoms, telefims and has appeared on number of talk shows and programs. In addition she hosted the 17th PTV Karachi Center Awards.

Films

Television

Awards and nominations

 2005: Lux Style Award for Best Television Actress for Masuri - Nominated
 2013: Pakistan Media Award for Best Supporting Actress for Aun Zara  - won
 2014: Hum Award for Best Supporting Actress for LAA - nominateds

References

External links 

 Sabreen Hisbani at Vidpk

Living people
Baloch people
Sindhi people
1986 births
Actresses from Karachi
Pakistani television actresses
21st-century Pakistani actresses